Gerd Schneider (18 December 1940 - 29 October 1983) was a German football player. He spent 7 seasons in the Bundesliga with 1. FC Kaiserslautern.

Honours
 DFB-Pokal finalist: 1961.

External links
 

1940 births
German footballers
1. FC Kaiserslautern players
SSV Jahn Regensburg players
FSV Frankfurt players
Bundesliga players
1983 deaths
Association football defenders